Buthaina Bint Ali Al Jabr Al Nuaimi is the Qatari Minister of Education and Higher Education. She was appointed as Minister on 19 October 2021.

Education 
Al Nuaimi holds a Bachelor of Arts and Education from the Qatar University and an Executive Master of Business Administration from the HEC Paris.

Career 
Until 2006, Al Nuaimi worked as a teacher and was head of department and vice principal at Qatari schools. In 2006, she started working for the Qatar Foundation. From 2016 until 2021, Al Nuaimi was the President of Pre-University Education at Qatar Foundation.

Since October 2021, Al Nuaimi has served as Minister of Education and Higher Education.

References 

Living people
Qatari politicians
21st-century Qatari politicians
Government ministers of Qatar
Year of birth missing (living people)

HEC Paris alumni
Qatar University alumni